Father Goose: His Book is a collection of nonsense poetry for children, written by L. Frank Baum and illustrated by W. W. Denslow, and first published in 1899. Though generally neglected a century later, the book was a groundbreaking sensation in its own era; "once America's best-selling children's book and L. Frank Baum's first success," Father Goose laid a foundation for the writing career that soon led to The Wonderful Wizard of Oz and all of Baum's later work.

Collaboration
The book grew out of Baum's first published verse collection, the previous year's By the Candelabra's Glare, which concluded with a section of poems for children. Baum expanded upon that section to create a new collection of nonsense verse; the 72 poems in Father Goose included two from the earlier book. Denslow had contributed two illustrations to Baum's first collection of poems, and had worked on Baum's trade periodical, The Show Window — though Father Goose was the two men's first sustained collaborative project. It was notable as a generally equal collaboration: Denslow sometimes drew pictures to Baum's poems, but Baum sometimes wrote or revised his verse in response to Denslow's drawings. Most commentators agree that Denslow's pictures outmatch Baum's texts; Denslow's illustrations for Father Goose have been considered his best work.

"Denslow's picture are both stylish and humorous. Moreover, he did not merely draw illustrations for the verse; he arranged pictures, color, and text to make an artistically unified page, so that the book resembled 'a series of art posters bound together.'" The result "is more Denslow's than Baum's book, for the art dominates and at times overpowers the text." (Denslow appreciated the quality of his own work; in a portent of future trouble between the two collaborators, he drafted a cover for the book with his own name in larger letters than Baum's. Denslow had to be talked into re-doing the cover with greater equality.)

Publisher
When the two men sought out a publisher for their book, they settled with the George M. Hill Co. In uniting Baum, Denslow, and Hill, Father Goose mustered the forces that would produce The Wonderful Wizard of Oz in the following year. Hill, however, was not prepared to risk much money on the two untried collaborators; their original deal required Baum and Denslow to pay for the full costs of printing the book. Subsequently, Hill invested some funds in the project: Baum and Denslow paid for all the artistic aspects of the book, including printing the color plates and cover and even the advertising, while Hill took responsibility for the paper, binding, and distribution costs.

To save money on printing, Baum and Denslow had the poetry hand-lettered by friend and artist Ralph Fletcher Seymour.  Seymour was assisted by fellow artist Charles Michael Jerome Costello; both men had contributed to By the Candelabra's Glare. Seymour would eventually be paid $67.25 for his work, and Costello $30.00.

Success
Father Goose was on sale in September 1899, in plenty of time for the Christmas season. It was a major success, selling more than 75,000 copies. The quality of the illustrations was far beyond anything that had been done in American children's books up to that time. Its marketplace success inspired at least a score of imitations in the next season, an Old Father Gander and a Mother Wild Goose and others; one Chicago newspaper commented on these "Goose pimples in the book trade this year." Denslow's work affected the style of illustration in other children's books, generally for the better.

The critical reception of the book was generally quite positive. Father Goose was also admired and enjoyed by figures like Mark Twain and William Dean Howells. Baum used some of his royalties from the book to buy a lakeside house in Macatawa, Michigan; he named the place "The Sign of the Goose" and decorated it with goose motifs.

Baum and Denslow followed up their triumph with The Songs of Father Goose (1900), which provided musical settings by composer Alberta Neiswanger Hall for 26 of the poems. Though not as popular as the original work, the songbook also sold well. Further projects to capitalize on the success, however, like a Father Goose Calendar, and a musical version that Baum and composer Paul Tietjens worked on in 1904, failed to materialize — though Baum would publish Father Goose's Year Book in 1907.

Selections from Father Goose were reprinted in Baum's 1910 anthology L. Frank Baum's Juvenile Speaker.

The verse
Baum stated the premise of his collection clearly in his opening rhyme:

Old Mother Goose became quite new,
And joined a Women's Club,
She left poor Father Goose at home
To care for Sis and Bub.
They called for stories by the score,
And laughed and cried to hear
All of the queer and merry songs
That in this book appear....

After its initial popularity, though, Father Goose proved to be less durable than those children's books that eventually become recognized as classics. No one claims that Baum's nonsense poems are as good as those of Edward Lear or Lewis Carroll. His verse is facile, but often little more than that:

Did you ever see a rabbit climb a tree?
Did you ever see a lobster ride a flea?
Did you ever?
No, you never!
For they simply couldn't do it, don't you see?

Baum continued in the vein of children's verse for a short time, producing his Army Alphabet and Navy Alphabet in 1900; then he largely abandoned verse for prose, and Oz was born.

Biases
Although Baum was comparatively progressive at the time he was writing, he sometimes exploited the racial and ethnic stereotypes common in his era for comic effect.  Michael Hearn described Father Goose asone of the few of the period that tried to reflect the contemporary United States, perhaps the first picture book to recognize the American urban melting pot. Today Baum and Denslow's depictions of  African American, Irish, Italian, Chinese, North American Indians, and others are unacceptable, being patronizing stereotypes once common to vaudeville, the Sunday funny papers, and other forms of popular art. However, Father Goose, unlike the conventional children's book of the time, did acknowledge that people of color and other cultures, however offensively portrayed here, were as much a part of American life as those of Anglo-Saxon descent.

For perspective of the issue of tolerance versus bias in Baum's canon, see Daughters of Destiny, Father Goose's Year Book, Sam Steele's Adventures on Land and Sea, Sky Island, and The Woggle-Bug Book.

References

External links

Books by L. Frank Baum
1899 children's books
1899 poetry books
American poetry collections
Children's poetry books
Nonsense poetry